Vasyl Ivanovych Lopata (born in Nova Basan, Bobrovytsia Raion, Chernihiv Oblast, Ukraine, Ukrainian Soviet Socialist Republic, USSR, on April 28, 1941) is a Ukrainian artist and prose writer. He is a member of the National Union of Artists of Ukraine (1971), National Union of Writers of Ukraine (2006). People's Painter of Ukraine (2001), laureate of Shevchenko National Prize (1993), Oles Honchar Literary Prize (2007), Lesya Ukrainka Literary and Art Prize (2008).

In collaboration with Borys Mykolayovych Maximov (Борис Миколайович Максимов), he designed the first Ukrainian hryvnia. As an artist, he worked principally in engraving and painting, also creating posters and ex-libris, among other things.

References

External links 
 Brochure or small, illustrated book on Lopata's engravings, in Ukrainian and English, downloadable from here. 
 Images of some of his works and a few photos of himself at "Modern Ukrainian Artists", Opheus and Lyra. 
 Three engravings by Vasyl Lopata at Artnet.
 A few illustrations by Vasyl Lopata for 12th-century epic poem, "The Tale of Ihor's Campaign", among illustrations by other artists, Encyclopedia of Ukraine.

Recipients of the Shevchenko National Prize
Ukrainian writers
Ukrainian painters
Ukrainian male painters
Recipients of the title of People's Painter of Ukraine
1941 births
Living people
People from Chernihiv Oblast